The term Gujarati Muslim is usually used to signify an Indian Muslim from the state of Gujarat in western coast of India. Most Gujarati Muslims have Gujarati language as their mother tongue, but some communities such as the Soomra & Sindhi have Kutchi other like Momin Ansari, Memons, Gujarati Shaikh (Hansotis) and others, have Urdu as their mother tongue. The majority of Gujarati Muslims are Sunni, with a minority of Shi'ite groups.

The Gujarati Muslims are further sub-divided into groups, such as the Sunni Vohra/Bohra, Ismāʿīlī, Khoja, Dawoodi Bohra, Memon, Surti, Miyan Bhai, Pathan people/Hansotis, Khatri, Ghanchi and Chhipa each with their own customs and traditions.

Gujarati Muslim merchants played a pivotal role in establishing Islam in Indonesia, Malaysia and other parts of South East Asia.

Gujarati Muslims are very prominent in industry and medium-sized businesses and there is a very large Gujarati Muslim community in Mumbai. A very large number of this community migrated to Pakistan in 1947 and have settled in Sindh province especially in Karachi. Having earned a formidable accolade as some of India's greatest seafaring merchants, the centuries-old Gujarati diaspora is found scattered throughout the Near East, Indian Ocean and Southern Hemisphere regions everywhere in between Africa and Japan with a notable presence in: Hong Kong, Britain, Portugal, Canada, Réunion, Oman, Yemen, Mozambique, Zanzibar, United Arab Emirates, Burma, Madagascar, South Africa, Sri Lanka, Mauritius, Pakistan, Zambia and East Africa.

History
Located in the westernmost portion of India, Gujarat includes the region of Kutch, Saurashtra and the territories between the rivers Banas and Damanganga. Islam came early to Gujarat, with immigrant communities of Arab and Persian traders. Most came as traders as they did before Islam and built a masjid during the times of Muhammad and other parts of the western seacoast of India as early as the 8th century C.E, spreading Islam soon as the religion gained a foothold in the Arabian peninsula. They were later joined by Arab and Persian traders from the Middle East. Many of these early merchants were Ismaili Shia, both Mustaali and Nizari. They laid the foundation of the Bohra and Khoja communities. In the early era however Gujarat was ruled by the Valabhi dynasty. In the thirteenth century, the last Hindu ruler Karna, was defeated by Alauddin Khalji, the Turkic Sultan of Delhi. This episode ushered a period of five centuries of Muslim Turkic and Mughal rule, leading to a conversion of a number of Hindu Gujarati people to Islam and the creation of new communities such as the Molesalam and Miyana communities.

In the sixteenth century, the Memon community immigrated from Sindh and settled in Kutch and Kathiawar. While in Bharuch and Surat, a schism occurred among the Bohras and a new community of Sunni Bohras was created. Another Muslim sect, the Mahdawi also settled in Gujarat and led to the creation of the Tai community. In 1593, the Mughal Emperor Akbar conquered Gujarat and incorporated Gujarat in the Mughal Empire. This period led to the settlement of the Mughal community. A good many Sayyid and Shaikh families also are said to have arrived during the period of Mughal rule. With the establishment of the Sufi Suhrawardi and Chishti orders in Multan, Sind and Gujarat, pirs enjoyed state patronage. At the same time, the Muslims from various provinces such as Hyderabad Deccan, Kerala, Balochistan, Sindh, Punjab, Gujarat, Kashmir and other parts of South Asia also moved to capitals of Muslim empire in Delhi and Agra. After the death of the Mughal emperor Aurangzeb, in 1707, Mughal rule began weaken after ruling for a century. Most of Gujarat fell to the Marathas, and this period saw the dispersal of further Pathans and Baluchis, who came as mercenaries and were destroyed or defeated by the Marathas. Gujarat fell to British in the late 19th century.

Gujarati Muslim merchants played an historically important role in facilitating the Portuguese discovery of "the East Indies", in spreading and propagating Islam to the Far East and in promoting the British discovery of Africa. In Southeast Asia, Malays referred to the Islamic elite among them by the noble title of adhirajas. The Sufi trader, Shaikh Randeri (Shaikh Raneri) was responsible for spreading Islam to Acheh in Indonesia. 
Surti merchants in particular also pioneered the use of scientific concepts and invented structural and mechanical advances in technology for the nationbuilding of Mauritius, such as introducing hydro-electric power to the people of Mauritius.

Jamat Bandi
Gujarati speaking Muslim society has a unique custom known as Jamat Bandi, literally meaning communal solidarity. This system is the traditional expression of communal solidarity. It is designed to regulate the affairs of the community and apply sanctions against infractions of the communal code. Almost all the main Gujarat communities, such as the Ismāʿīlī, Khoja, Dawoodi Bohra, Chhipa and Sunni Bohra have caste associations, known as jamats. Social organization at the Jamat Bandi level varies from community to community. In some communities, the Jamat simply runs a mosque and attached rest house and a madrasah. Some larger communities, such as the Khoja and Memon have developed elaborate and highly formalized systems with written and registered constitutions. Their organizations own large properties, undertake housing projects and schools, dispensaries and weekly newspapers.

Communities
The region of Kutch has always been historically distinct, with the Muslims there accounting for about twenty percent of the population. This region is characterised by salt deserts, such as the Rann of Kutch. Because of this landscape, the Kutch Muslims are Maldhari pastoral nomads found in the Banni region of Kutch. Most of them are said to have originated in Sindh and speak a dialect of Kutchi which has many Sindhi loanwords. Major Maldhari communities include the Soomra, Sandhai Muslims, Jats, Halaypotra, Hingora, Hingorja, Juneja. The other important Muslim community is the Khatiawari Memon community, that migrated and resettled beyond Gujarat.

Coastal Gujarat is home to Urdu speaking communities such as those of Hansot and Olpad. Hansot Muslims are divergent genotypically in that their MtDNA is of greater foreign origins in comparison to the Y-DNA.
The Gujarat coastline is also home to significant numbers of Siddi, otherwise known as Zanji or Habshi, descendants of Africans e.g. Royal Habshis (Abyssinian aristocracy e.g. Siddi Sayyid) or Bantu peoples from Southeast Africa that were brought to the Indian subcontinent as slaves by the Portuguese and Arab merchants. Siddis are primarily Sufi Muslims, although some are Hindus and others Roman Catholic Christians. Malik Ambar, a prominent military figure in Indian history at large, remains a figure of veneration to the Siddis of Gujarat.

Bharuchi and Surti Muslims
There is historical evidence of Arabs and Persians settling along the Konkan-Gujarat coast as early as the 9th, 8th and perhaps 7th century. Arab traders landed at Ghogha (located just across the narrow Gulf of Cambay from Bharuch/Surat) around the early seventh century and built a masjid there facing Jeruselum. Thus Gujarat has the oldest mosque in India built between 624 and 626 C.E. by the Arabs who traded and stayed there. These Arabs and others who settled in Bharuch and Surat were sailors, merchants and nakhudas, who belonged to various South Arabian coastal tribes while others were from the Persian Gulf and Mediterranean, and large numbers married local women adopting the local Gujarati language and customs over time.

Over the course of history, a number of famous Arab travelers, scholars, Sufi-saints and geographers who visited India, have described the presence of thriving Arab Muslim communities scattered along the Konkan-Gujarat coast. Suleiman of Basra who reached Thana in 841 AD, observed that the Rashtrakuta empire which extended from Bharuch to Chaul during his time, was on friendly terms with the Arabs and Balhara kings appointed Arab merchant princes as governors and administrators in their vast kingdom. Ibn Hawqal, a 10th-century Muslim Arab geographer and chronicler while on his travels observed that mosques flourished in four cities of Gujarat that had Hindu kings, with mosques being found in Cambay, Kutch, Saymur and Patan, alluding to an atmosphere where Muslim foreigners were assimilated into the local milieu of medieval Gujarati societies. His well-known Iranian contemporary Estakhri, the Persian medieval geographer who traveled to Cambay and other regions of Gujarat during the same period, echoed the words spoken by his predecessors alongside his itineraries. Al-Masudi, an Arab historian from Baghdad who was a descendant of Abdullah Ibn Mas'ud, a companion of Prophet Muhammad traveled to Gujarat in 918 C.E. and bore written witness account that more than 10,000 Arab Muslims from Siraf (Persia) Madha in Oman, Hadhramaut in Yemen, Basra, Baghdad, and other cities in the Middle East, had settled in the seaport of Chamoor, a port close to Bharuch.

Despite the medieval conquest of Gujarat by Alauddin Khalji and its annexation to the Delhi Sultanate in the 13th century, peaceful Islamic settlements appear to have continued under Hindu rule. Bi-lingual Indian inscriptions from Somnath in Sanskrit and Arabic, make reference to the Arab and Iranian shipowners who constructed mosques in Gujarat from the grants given to Muslims by the Vaghela rajput ruler, Arjunadeva.
 Similar epitaphs mention the arrival of pious Muslim nakhudas from Hormuz as well as families from Bam residing in Cambay, and from the discovery of tombstones of personages from Siraf, at the time one of the most important ports on the Iranian coast in the Persian Gulf, suggests altogether that the Muslim community of Junagadh had a strong and established link with Iran through the commercial sea routes. The 19th century European Gazetteer by George Newenham Wright,  corroborates this cultural exchange through the ages as he points out that the Arab inhabitants of Mukalla, capital city of the Hadhramaut coastal region in Yemen, were known to intermarry with the Muslims of Kathiawar and those resident from other areas of Gujarat.

Arabic sources speak of the warm reception of the significant immigration of Hadhrami sāda (descendants of Muhammed) who settled in Surat during the Gujarat Sultanate. Prominent and well respected Sāda who claimed noble descent through Abu Bakr al-Aydarus ("Patron Saint of Aden"), were held in high esteem among the people and became established as Arab religious leaderships of local Muslims. Intermarriages with Indian Muslim women were highly sought which led to a creole Hadhrami-Indian community to flourish in Gujarat by the 17th century.

Early 14th-century Maghrebi adventurer, Ibn Batuta, who visited India with his entourage, recalls in his memoirs about Cambay, one of the great emporia of the Indian Ocean that indeed:

In the 17th century, the eminent city of Surat, famous for its cargo export of silk and diamonds had come on a par with contemporary Venice and Beijing which were some of the great mercantile cities of Europe and Asia, and earned the distinguished title, Bab al-Makkah (Gate of Mecca) because it is one of the great places of the subcontinent where ancient Hindus welcomed Islam and it flourished as time went on.

Diverse Origins - DNA Testing 
More recently Yunus Aswat has been leading an online project called "Gujarati Muslims" to find the diverse origins of Gujarati Muslims through DNA testing.

Notable Gujarati Muslims
Abdur Rahman ibn Yusuf Mangera of the UK who is a prominent Islamic Scholar once listed as one of the 500 most influential Muslims in the world, Ismail ibn Musa Menk, another prominent Islamic Scholar also of Gujarati descent, Azim Premji Chairman of Wipro Limited, South African cricketer Hashim Amla, South African Quran - Bible Scholar Ahmed Deedat, Caribbean eschatologist and Islamic scholar Imran N. Hosein, Badruddin Tyabji, a Congress president and Mohammad Ali Jinnah, the founding father of Pakistan. Bollywood is represented by Asha Parekh who is half Gujarati Muslim, Farooq Shaikh, Nushrat Bharucha , and Sanjeeda Sheikh. Famous Indian film score composers include Salim–Sulaiman Merchant who are Ismaili Shia and Taher Saifuddin, who was the 51st Da'i al-Mutlaq of the Dawoodi Bohras, a sect within Shia Islam. Famous political activists such as Ahmed Timol, Yusuf Dadoo, Ahmed Kathrada, Ebrahim Aswat and his daughters Zainab Asvat and Amina Cachalia played a leading role in the anti-apartheid movement of South Africa.

See also
 Sayyid of Gujarat
 Khoja
 Memon
 Ismailis
 Alavi Bohras
 Dawoodi Bohras
Khatiawari Memon
 Muslim Rajputs
 Islam in India
 Gujarat Sultanate
 Nakhuda
 Jats of Kutch
 Pathans of Gujarat
 Arabs in India
 Al Masudi
 Ibn Batuta
 Nuruddin ar-Raniri from Rander
 Abu Bakr al-Aydarus, Hadhrami religious scholar of sufism
 Ba 'Alawi sada
 Abdullah ibn Alawi al-Haddad
 Shah e Alam
 Wajihuddin Alvi
 List of ziyarat locations

References

Islam in India by location
Social groups of Pakistan

Social groups of Gujarat